Kagiso Tshelametsi (born 7 July 1980) is a Botswana footballer who plays as a goalkeeper for Notwane FC. He won 12 caps for the Botswana national football team between 2000 and 2006.He is also Baoganne Tshelametsi's cousin who worked under the Botswana military police together with the former Botswana president Sir Seretse Khama Ian Khama.

External links
 

Association football goalkeepers
Botswana footballers
Botswana international footballers
1980 births
Living people
Mogoditshane Fighters players
Notwane F.C. players
Expatriate footballers in Trinidad and Tobago
TT Pro League players
F.C. Satmos players